L'APPEL is a non-profit humanitarian organization supporting needy children around the globe. It was founded in 1968 by a group of French doctors specialized in pediatrics to help children in Vietnam suffering from the war. For over 40 years l'Appel has led humanitarian projects around the world, developing schools and hospitals in countries in need with the help of locals. Its headquarters are in Paris, France, but the association has offices throughout the country. Private donors provide 59% of the association's budget, along with funding from corporate sponsorship and public organizations such as the Ministry of Foreign Affairs and the European Union. Over 85% of its budget goes to the funding of its numerous programs. L'Appel is also working on projects with UNHCR. 

The association operates in 9 countries of Asia, Africa, Latin America (Vietnam, El Salvador, Haiti, Madagascar, Chad, Republic of the Congo, Peru, Rwanda, Burkina Faso) helping children, who suffer from diseases and natural disasters. The association has  intervened in over 18 countries, including Algeria, Cameroun, Poland and Armenia.

Activities 
 Improving hygiene in children hospitals and maternity homes
 Supporting street kids, disabled kids and orphans
 Preventing AIDS expansion
 Improving water supply and sanitation
 Providing and upgrading medical help, including vaccination, obstetrics, emergency, orphanages, and pharmaceutics
 Supplying medical equipment
 Rural development
 Education
 Empowering and providing jobs to women

See also
List of non-governmental organizations in Vietnam

External links
—Official website of L'APPEL

Children's charities based in France
Charities based in France
Foreign charities operating in Vietnam